The 2007 Korea National League was the fifth season of the Korea National League. It was divided into two stages, and the winners of each stage qualified for the championship playoff.

Regular season

First stage

Second stage

Championship playoff

Summary

Results

Hyundai Mipo Dockyard won 7–1 on aggregate.

Awards

Main awards

Source:

Best XI

Source:

See also
 2007 in South Korean football
 2007 Korea National League Championship
 2007 Korean FA Cup

References

External links

Korea National League seasons
K